Thymbra, common name Mediterranean thyme, is a genus of plants in the family Lamiaceae. As currently categorized, the genus has seven species and one subspecies. It is native to the Mediterranean region of southern Europe, North Africa, and the Middle East.

Species
Thymbra calostachya (Rech.f.) Rech.f. - Crete
Thymbra capitata (L.) Cav. - widespread from Morocco + Portugal to Turkey + Palestine
Thymbra sintenisii Bornm. & Azn. - Iraq, Turkey
Thymbra spicata L. - Greece, Turkey, Syria, Lebanon, Palestine, Israel, Iraq, Iran
Thymbra thymbrifolia (Hedge & Feinbrun) Bräuchler, comb. nov. - Israel, Palestine, Judean Desert, Khirbet el Mird
Thymbra nabateorum (Danin & Hedge) Bräuchler, comb. nov. - W of Jordan and the adjacent N of Saudi Arabia
Thymbra linearifolia (Brullo & Furnari) Bräuchler, comb. nov. - Libya

References

External links
Practical Plants

Lamiaceae
Lamiaceae genera
Taxa named by Carl Linnaeus
Flora of the Mediterranean Basin